Pablo Andrés Saucedo (born March 6, 1982 in Moreno, Buenos Aires) is an Argentine-born Ecuadorian football central defender who plays for Portoviejo.

References

External links

1982 births
Living people
People from Moreno Partido
Sportspeople from Buenos Aires Province
Argentine emigrants to Ecuador
Association football defenders
Ecuadorian footballers
Ferro Carril Oeste footballers
Manta F.C. footballers
Gimnasia y Esgrima de Jujuy footballers
Barcelona S.C. footballers